Franklin Terry Bruce (born March 6, 1975) is a former Republican member of the Kansas Senate, representing the 34th district from 2005 until 2017. He previously worked as an Assistant District Attorney for Reno County, Kansas. He has also interned with Speaker of the House Robin Jennison and has worked for House Majority Leader Clay Aurand.

He first served in the Kansas Senate beginning in 2005. However, he lost his primary in 2016 to fellow Republican Ed Berger.

Controversies

Sales tax increase
In June 2015, Bruce voted in favor of SB 270, which increased Kansas state sales tax from 6.15% to 6.5%, while also increasing the cigarette tax by 50 cents. According to the American Tax Foundation, this was the 8th highest tax increase in the history of the United States.

Gay marriage
In March 2014, Bruce stated that he supported Kansas's ban on gay marriage and opposed efforts then to remove the ban.

Committee assignments
Since 2013, Senator Bruce has served on the following legislative committees:
 2013 Special Committee on Judiciary
 Assessment and Taxation
 Confirmation Oversight, chair
 Interstate Cooperation, vice-chair
 Joint Committee on Special Claims Against the State
 Judiciary
 Legislative Coordinating Council
 Organization, Calendar and Rules, vice-chair

Major donors
Some of the top contributors to Sen. Bruce's 2008 campaign, according to the National Institute on Money in State Politics:
 Terry Bruce (self-finance), Kansas Republican Senatorial Committee, Kansas Chamber of Commerce, Kansas Republican Senatorial Committee, Kansas Bankers Association

Sen. Bruce financed $22,972 of his own campaign, more than any of his other donor groups.

References

External links
Kansas Senate biography
Project Vote Smart profile
 Campaign contributions: 2004, 2006, 2008
Senator Bruce's website

Republican Party Kansas state senators
Living people
1975 births
21st-century American politicians
Fort Hays State University alumni
University of Kansas School of Law alumni